The Rev. Wm James Reid House is a historic frame vernacular home, located in Fort Meade, Florida and was built between 1899-1914.  It was built over another structure sometime in the late 1880s, as the lot appears in an 1880s survey.  The property which compromises of Orange Ave and Oak St were part of the Jack Robeson addition, which the house sits on today.  One of the last two surviving carriage stones in Polk County was located in front of the home for more than 100 years.  It was originally owned by Reverend William James Reid (1858–1931) and Stella C. Reid (1869–1954) from Hanceville, Alabama.  Mr. Wm James Reid was a minister for the North Alabama Conference Methodist Church South.  The home was later owned by his son Claude 'Cauntess' Reid (1894–1976), who lived in the house until his death in 1976.  After Claude's death, the home was left in the possession of his sister Carrie B. Reid (1898–2001).  The home was left vacant for many years and was then sold to the Harpe family sometime around 1985.

The Reid House was used for the HBO motion picture film Judgment featuring Blythe Danner, Keith Carradine, Jack Warden and David Strathairn.  HBO partially refurbished the upper level of the house by adding a doorway between the master bedroom and the room next door, for which they used to film some of the scenes in the movie. The home was restored sometime between 1995-2004 by the Harpe family and then was sold to a family who left it in disrepair.  The Reid House was then purchased by the Wolpins who are in the process of restoring and placing it on the National Register of Historic Places.

Historic details

The Wm. James Reid house is a three-story Colonial Revival, in it original form since its conception in the early 1900s. The home features four eloquent parlors with high ceilings, original plaster, original doors and transoms, wave lead glass, cedar frame and heartpine floors. All the original features from the sliding pocket doors to the lovely copper handles are well preserved and in magnificent shape.

Location 
The Wm. James Reid House is located within the bounds of the Fort Meade Historic District which is a U.S. historic district (designated as such on July 29, 1994) located in Fort Meade, Florida. The district is bounded by North 3rd Street, Orange Avenue, South 3rd Street and Sand Mountain Road. It contains 151 historic buildings.

Houses in Polk County, Florida
Vernacular architecture in Florida
Historic district contributing properties in Florida
National Register of Historic Places in Polk County, Florida
Fort Meade, Florida